Radim Vrbata (born 13 June 1981) is a Czech former professional ice hockey right winger. He had a 16-year career in the National Hockey League (NHL). Vrbata was originally drafted in 1999 by the Colorado Avalanche, with whom he has also played, along with the Carolina Hurricanes, Chicago Blackhawks, Arizona Coyotes, Tampa Bay Lightning, Vancouver Canucks and Florida Panthers during his NHL career. Radim Vrbata was also an NHL All-Star in 2015.

Playing career
Vrbata was drafted in the seventh round, 212th overall, by the Colorado Avalanche in the 1999 NHL Entry Draft. He won the 2001 World Junior Championship and the 2005 IIHF World Championship with the Czech Republic. He played his first game in February 2002 against the New york Islanders, then scored his first NHL goal against the Rangers a night later. He finished his rookie season with 18 goals and 12 assists, mainly playing with Peter Forsberg and Joe Sakic.

In March 2003, Vrbata was traded to the Carolina Hurricanes in exchange for Bates Battaglia, later being acquired by the Chicago Blackhawks on 30 December 2005, in exchange for future considerations. After two subpar seasons with Chicago, he was traded to the Phoenix Coyotes on 11 August 2007, for Kevyn Adams. During his first year in Phoenix, he set career highs in goals, assists and led the team in scoring.

On 1 July 2008, Vrbata, as a free agent, signed a three-year contract with the Tampa Bay Lightning. After starting the 2008–09 season out of form and citing confidence issues, and the fact that his wife was having difficulty during pregnancy, Vrbata asked and was granted permission to return home to the Czech Republic on 8 December 2008. On 2 January 2009, he joined his hometown team, BK Mladá Boleslav. Vrbata's stint with Boleslav, however, was cut short when he was sent on loan to Bílí Tygři Liberec on 29 January 2009.

After finishing the season in the Czech Republic, Vrbata advised the Lightning he intended to return to the NHL for the second year of his contract for the 2009–10 season. Having already filled Vrbata's spot on the team's roster, however, Tampa Bay had no interests in retaining Vrbata and his agent, Rich Evans, was subsequently given permission to orchestrate a trade with another NHL organization. Thus, on 21 July 2009, Vrbata was traded back to the Coyotes in exchange for David Hale and Todd Fedoruk for a second stint with the team. He would total 43 goals in his next two seasons with the team, coupled with four Stanley Cup playoff goals as Phoenix qualified for the playoffs in both 2010 and 2011, losing both times to the Detroit Red Wings.

On 21 February 2012, Vrbata scored two goals in a 5–4 shootout victory over the Los Angeles Kings. His second goal gave him 30 on the season, a career high. He would finish the 2011–12 season with a career-high 35 goals in which he led the entire NHL in game-winners, with 12.

On 2 July 2014, Vrbata signed as an unrestricted free agent to a two-year, $10 million contract with the Vancouver Canucks. Vrbata stated the opportunity to play with the Sedin twins was a large factor in his decision. In his first season in Vancouver, 2014–15, Vrbata enjoyed a career year, finishing the regular season with 63 points in 79 games, besting his previous 62-point career-high season in 2011–12. He also led the Canucks in goals with 31, his second-highest single-season total behind the 35 he scored in 2011–12, and was selected to play in the All-Star Game, where for Team Foligno he scored the opening goal of the game and registered an assist in a 17–12 loss to Team Toews.

In the final year of his contract with the Canucks, Vrbata endured a disappointing 2015–16 season, producing just 27 points in his lowest offensive totals since 2009. As a free agent in the following off-season, Vrbata opted to return for a third stint with the Arizona Coyotes, agreeing to a one-year, $1 million bonus-laden contract on 16 August 2016.

During the 2016–17 season, on 25 November 2016, Vrbata became the NHL's all-time leader in shootout goals. In his return to Arizona, Vrbata led the club with 20 goals and 55 points in 81 games.

As a free agent from the rebuilding Coyotes, Vrbata signed a one-year, $2.5 million bonus-laden contract with the Florida Panthers on 1 July 2017.

On 7 April 2018, Vrbata announced his retirement from professional hockey after 16 seasons.

Personal life
Vrbata is from the same city as former Chicago Blackhawks teammate Martin Havlát, Mladá Boleslav. Vrbata's brother David is also a professional hockey player.

Career statistics

Regular season and playoffs

International

References

External links

1981 births
Arizona Coyotes players
Carolina Hurricanes players
Chicago Blackhawks players
Colorado Avalanche draft picks
Colorado Avalanche players
Czech ice hockey right wingers
Florida Panthers players
HC Bílí Tygři Liberec players
Hershey Bears players
Hull Olympiques players
Living people
National Hockey League All-Stars
Sportspeople from Mladá Boleslav
Phoenix Coyotes players
BK Mladá Boleslav players
Shawinigan Cataractes players
Tampa Bay Lightning players
Vancouver Canucks players
Czech expatriate ice hockey players in Canada
Czech expatriate ice hockey players in the United States